Miguel Ángel Morro Muñoz (born 11 September 2000) is a Spanish professional footballer who plays as a goalkeeper for Rayo Vallecano.

Club career
Born in Alcalá de Henares, Community of Madrid, Community of Madrid, Morro represented AD Naya, Real Madrid, Alcobendas CF, RSD Alcalá and Rayo Vallecano. On 31 January 2019, he renewed his contract with the latter until 2023.

Morro made his senior debut with the reserves on 3 February 2019, starting in a 1–0 Tercera División home win against CD Leganés B. On 11 October, after both first team goalkeepers were out (Alberto García injured and Stole Dimitrievski on international duty), he made his professional debut by playing the full 90 minutes in a 2–1 home defeat of CD Tenerife in the Segunda División.

On 25 August 2021, Morro was loaned to CF Fuenlabrada in the second division, for one year.

Career statistics

Club

References

External links

2000 births
Living people
People from Alcalá de Henares
Spanish footballers
Footballers from the Community of Madrid
Association football goalkeepers
Segunda División players
Tercera División players
Rayo Vallecano B players
Rayo Vallecano players
CF Fuenlabrada footballers
Spain youth international footballers
Spain under-21 international footballers